The BBC Variety Programmes Policy Guide For Writers and Producers, commonly referred to as The Green Book, is a booklet of guidelines, issued by the British Broadcasting Corporation in 1949, to the producers and writers of its comedy programmes. It detailed what was then permissible as comedy material, but its bureaucratic tone and outlandish strictures caused great amusement in the comedy world at the time.

Most of its content is now completely out of date. It was a confidential document and was kept under lock and key. The executive responsible for its release was the then Head of Variety, Michael Standing, although it contained a large amount of material which had been previously issued, in the preceding years, in memo form.

The full text was published, with the BBC's permission, in the book Laughter in the Air by Barry Took, in 1976. It has since been sold by the BBC itself.

Content
Among jokes banned were those concerning lavatories, effeminacy in men, immorality of any kind, suggestive references to honeymoon couples, chambermaids, fig-leaves, ladies' underwear (such as "winter draws on" and so on), lodgers and commercial travellers and the vulgar use of words such as "basket".

Caution had to be taken with jokes about drink, with not too many allowed to be made in any single programme. Also to be avoided were derogatory references to solicitors, miners and "the working class". Banned too was any reference to The McGillycuddy of the Reeks, or jokes about his name, in response to previous complaints.

The word "nigger" was banned, although the phrase "Nigger Minstrels" was still tolerated.  The document also advised: "Extreme care should be taken in dealing with references to or jokes about pre-natal influences (e.g. His mother was frightened by a donkey)"

It has been observed that if these rules had been strictly followed, a great many of the BBC's most successful comedy shows since, such as Beyond our Ken, Till Death Us Do Part, Steptoe and Son, would never have been aired.

The successor to the Green Book, the Producer Guidelines, the corporation's programme-making code of ethics was introduced by Director-General John Birt in 1989. This was comprehensively rewritten in 1993 largely by the BBC's Controller of Editorial Policy Richard James Ayre who went on to become a BBC Trustee. and, retitled the BBC Editorial Guidelines are now on the seventh edition.

Further reading

References

BBC
British radio comedy
Censorship in the United Kingdom
1949 in the United Kingdom
1949 in radio